Geritola nitide is a butterfly in the family Lycaenidae first described by Hamilton Herbert Druce in 1910. It is found in Cameroon.

References

Endemic fauna of Cameroon
Butterflies described in 1910
Poritiinae